Eupithecia nephelata is a moth in the  family Geometridae. It is found in Afghanistan, Kyrgyzstan, Tajikistan, Jammu and Kashmir, western China (Xinjiang) and Mongolia.

References

Moths described in 1897
nephelata
Moths of Asia